Established in 1986, The Frameline Award is given every year at the Frameline Film Festival in San Francisco to a person or entity that has made a major contribution to LGBTQ+ representation in film, television, or the media arts.

List of Honorees 

1986 Vito Russo 
1987 Alexandra von Grote 
1988 Divine 
1989 Cinevista / Promovision 
1990 Robert Epstein 
1991 Elfi Mikesch 
1992 Marlon Riggs 
1993 Pratibha Parmar 
1994 Christine Vachon 
1995 Marcus Hu 
1996 Peter Adair 
1997 Channel Four Television 
1998 Dolly Hall 
1999 Stanley Kwan 
2000 Barbara Hammer 
2001 The Festival’s Founders 
2002 Isaac Julien 
2003 Fenton Bailey & Randy Barbato 
2004 Rose Troche 
2005 Gregg Araki 
2006 François Ozon 
2007 Andrea Sperling 
2008 Michael Lumpkin 
2009 George Kuchar & Mike Kuchar 
2010 Wolfe Video 
2011 Margaret Cho 
2012 B. Ruby Rich 
2013 Jamie Babbit 
2014 George Takei 
2015 Jeffrey Schwarz 
2016 Bob Hawk 
2017 Alan Cumming 
2018 Debra Chasnoff 
2019 Rodney Evans

References

LGBT film awards